Seonu Hwi (1922-1986) was a South Korean author and novelist.

Life
Seonu Hwi was born on January 3, 1922, in Chongju, Pyeonganbuk-do, Korea (in what is now North Korea). A writer poet, journalist, soldier and philosopher he also fought in the Korean War from 1950 to 1952. poet, journalist, soldier and philosopher. He was a famous realist and anticommunist writer and journalist. Seonu Hwi graduated from Gyeongseong Teachers School in 1944. He worked as a reporter for Chosun Ilbo before enlisting in the army in 1949 as an information and education officer. He made his literary debut in 1955 with the publication of his story "Ghost" (Gwisin).

Work
The Korea Literature Translation Institute summarized Seonu Hwi's work:

Behavioral humanism, or the expression of an active will in dire situations, characterizes Sunwoo Hwi’s literary world. “Flowers of Fire” (Bulkkot), for which he first gained recognition, features a man who overcomes his escapist mentality to embrace the spirit of resistance. As revealed in “Flowers of Fire” as well as in the novels Flagman Without a Flag (Gitbal eomneun gisu) and The Finale of the Chase (Chujeogui pinalle), the will to act is rooted in respect for mankind and desire to oppose dehumanization. For Sunwoo Hwi, the responsibility of intellectuals includes active participation in the affairs of the society and resistance to dehumanization caused by ideological conflicts and social ills. The humanistic approach, however, is overemphasized in works such as Myth of Bush-Clover Village (Ssaritgorui sinhwa), giving the work the feel of an imaginary world removed from contemporary reality. After 1965, Sunwoo Hwi began to evince a more conservative attitude towards the establishment. “Golgotha Without Cross” (Sipjaga eomneun golgoda), “A Thirteen-Year-Old Boy” (Yeol sesarui sonyeon) and “A Funny Story About Funny People” focus on nostalgia for lost childhood homes, and The Jackpot (Nodaji), serialized in Chosun Weekly from 1979 to 1981, is a family chronicle.

Works in translation 
 The Mirror (선우휘단편집)

Works in Korean (partial) 
 Seonu Hwi munhakjunjip (선우휘 문학전집) (1987)
 Ghost (귀신)
 Fired (화재)
 Manghyang (망향)
 Legend of Saritkgo (싸릿골 신화)

Awards 
 Dong-in Literary Award (1957)

See also 
 Jo Gap-je
 Ji Man-won
 Jun Won-tchack

References

External links 
 Sunwoo Hwe:Korean historical person information 
 Sunwoo Hwe:Daum 
 윤전기 세우고 'DJ 납치사설' 쓰다 - 조선일보  

1922 births
1986 deaths
South Korean politicians
South Korean journalists
Korean educators
South Korean writers
South Korean civil rights activists
South Korean anti-communists
South Korean military personnel of the Korean War
People from Chongju
People from North Pyongan
Disease-related deaths in South Korea
Seonu clan of Taiyuan
20th-century journalists